The 1916 Colorado Silver and Gold football team was an American football team that represented the University of Colorado as a member of the Rocky Mountain Conference (RMC) during the 1916 college football season. Led by first-year head coach Bob Evans, Colorado compiled an overall record of 1–5–1 with a mark of 1–5 in conference play, placing seventh in the RMC.

Schedule

References

Colorado
Colorado Buffaloes football seasons
Colorado Silver and Gold football